Will is a 2011 British sports drama directed by Ellen Perry and starring Damian Lewis, Perry Eggleton and Bob Hoskins.

Plot
The film centres on the trials and tribulations in the lives of two main fictional characters: eleven-year-old Will Brennan and Bosnian footballer Alek, and their trek to see Liverpool play AC Milan in the 2005 Champions League Final at the Atatürk Olympic Stadium in Istanbul.

Brennan is Liverpool's number one fan, able to recite facts ad infinitum about the club and at a public school in the south of England since his father Gareth (Damian Lewis) is emotionally unable to care for him following the death of Will's mother. Gareth appears one day out of the blue with tickets for Liverpool's trip to the Champions League Final. Unknown to Will his father has health problems and suddenly dies and in his belief that the adults in his life are conspiring to quash his wish to get to the match to honour his father, two of his mates at school start Will on his way for reason of their own. His being missing becomes worldwide news and he encounters others that either support Liverpool or the game of football. One of these is Alek, in Paris, who stopped playing the sport following a tragic incident due to his own actions in his hometown during the Bosnian War.

Alek is initially reluctant to get involved for various reason but a friend does his best to encourage Alek to recover from his personal demons by helping Will reach his destination. The two are off on the final leg of the journey stopping along the way in Alek's hometown where they elude police. Although they reach Istanbul they do not have tickets but in the quest to get them Liverpool stars Kenny Dalglish, Steven Gerrard and Jamie Carragher, recognise him who come to the rescue and makes possible for Will to realise his dream and much more than he could have imagined if his father's original plans had come to be.

Partial cast
 Damian Lewis - Gareth 
 Perry Eggleton - Will
 Kieran Wallbanks - Simon
 Brandon Robinson - Richie
 Jane March - Sister Noell 
 Bob Hoskins - Davey 
 Kristian Kiehling - Alek
 Alice Krige - Sister Carmel 
 Rebekah Staton - Nancy 
 Mark Dymond - Detective 
 Branko Tomović - Avdo Bilic 
 Canan Ergüder - Mina Bilic 
 Malcolm Storry - Finch 
 Neil Fitzmaurice - Fitzy
 John May - Barney 
 Jamie Carragher - Himself
 Steven Gerrard - Himself
 Kenny Dalglish - Himself

Filming locations
The production filmed in Kent in May 2010 at the Port of Ramsgate, the Port of Dover and the White Cliffs of Dover. The locations feature at the start of Will's journey to Istanbul, as he smuggles himself onto a freight lorry in order to cross the sea to France.

References

External links
 
 

2011 films
2004–05 UEFA Champions League
British association football films
British sports drama films
Films shot at Elstree Film Studios
Liverpool F.C.
2010s sports drama films
2011 drama films
2010s English-language films
2010s British films
English-language sports drama films